Bridge is a village and civil parish near Canterbury in Kent, South East England.

Bridge village is in the Nailbourne valley in a rural setting on the old Roman road, Watling Street, formerly the main road between London and Dover. The village itself is centred 2.5 miles south-east of the city of Canterbury.

History
It is likely that the parish took its name from "Bregge", a bridge which crossed the river Nailbourne, a tributary of the Stour. The parish church is dedicated to Saint Peter.

Geography
The village is surrounded by a buffer zone, and is almost entirely residential and agricultural. Its layout is a cross between a linear settlement and a clustered settlement.

Amenities
Bourne Park is a Queen Anne mansion with lake, occasionally open to the public. Its façade and structure date mostly to 1702.

References

External links

Bridge village website

Villages in Kent
City of Canterbury
Civil parishes in Kent